Twin Trees Farm is a historic home located at Richboro, Northampton Township, Bucks County, Pennsylvania. The first section was built about 1740–1760, and is a -story, one room rubble brownstone structure with an attic above.  The larger section was built in 1779, and is a -story, five bay, cut brownstone house in the Georgian style. The rear side is built of rubble fieldstone.
It was added to the National Register of Historic Places in 1975.

References

Houses on the National Register of Historic Places in Pennsylvania
Georgian architecture in Pennsylvania
Houses completed in 1779
Houses in Bucks County, Pennsylvania
National Register of Historic Places in Bucks County, Pennsylvania